Wiklöf is a surname which is mostly used in Nordic countries. People with the surname include:

 Lasse Wiklöf (1944–2008), Finnish politician
 Mattias Wiklöf (born 1979), Swedish football player
 Oscar Wiklöf (born January 2003), Finnish football player 

Finnish-language surnames
Swedish-language surnames